St Patrick's Catholic College is a coeducational secondary school located in Thornaby-on-Tees in the Borough of Stockton-on-Tees, England.

Previously a voluntary aided school administered by Stockton-on-Tees Borough Council and the Roman Catholic Diocese of Middlesbrough, St Patrick's Catholic College converted to academy status in September 2015 and became part of the Nicholas Postgate Catholic Academy Trust when it was formed in September 2018.

St Patrick's Catholic College offers GCSEs, BTECs and Cambridge Nationals as programmes of study for pupils.

References

External links
St Patrick's Catholic College official website

Secondary schools in the Borough of Stockton-on-Tees
Catholic secondary schools in the Diocese of Middlesbrough
Academies in the Borough of Stockton-on-Tees
Thornaby-on-Tees